Kenneth Anderson Brown (born May 5, 1971) is a former American football linebacker who played one season with the Denver Broncos of the National Football League. He was drafted by the Denver Broncos in the fourth round of the 1995 NFL Draft. He played college football at Virginia Tech and attended Monacan High School in Richmond, Virginia. Brown also attended Fork Union Military Academy.

References

External links
Just Sports Stats

Living people
1977 births
Players of American football from Richmond, Virginia
American football linebackers
Virginia Tech Hokies football players
Denver Broncos players
Sportspeople from Wiesbaden